Elachista chamaea is a moth of the family Elachistidae. It is found in Russia (the Southern Ural Mountains).

The wingspan is 9.3–10.8 mm. The forewings are brownish white, with the basal 1/4 of the costa dark grey. There is sometimes a brownish-grey spot in the middle of the wing at the fold, and another similar spot at the distal 1/4 of the wing. The hindwings are translucent, bluish grey and the fringe is ochreous white.

References

chamaea
Moths described in 2003
Endemic fauna of Russia
Moths of Europe